Stefano Dall' Arzere or Stefano Dell'Arzere was an Italian painter of the second half of the 16th century.

According to Ridolfi and others, Dall' Arzere was a native of Padua. He painted numerous altar-pieces for the churches and convents of that city. In the Chiesa degli Eremitani, he painted some subjects from the Old Testament, and two pictures of 'St. Peter' and 'St. Paul,' and in the church of the Servite monastery the principal altar-piece is by him.

References

Attribution:
 

Year of birth unknown
Year of death unknown
16th-century Italian painters
Italian male painters
Painters from Padua